Sealine is an English brand of motor yachts. It is originated in the former Sealine boatyard in Kidderminster that was founded in the 1970s by Tom Murrant. As of 2013, the brand belongs to the parent company of German HanseYachts AG.

History

Founding and rise (1972–1997) 
The English aircraft engineer and boating enthusiast Tom Murrant (1939–2005) founded the Sealine parent company Fibrasonic Marine Ltd. in 1972 with the help of three other persons. Manufacturing started near Bobbington, Staffordshire. The first model was a 23 ft GRP family cruiser with sterndrive (23 Continental). In the wake of the world oil crisis 1973, the young company suffered and survived several years by producing items for other sectors and as subcontractor for other boat builders. In 1978, Fibrasonic Marine presented two models under the new brand name C-Line. Furthermore, the company moved to a larger site in Kidderminster, Worcestershire. In 1979, C-Line became Sealine, and an 18 ft weekender with coloured hull was launched. More and more, the brand stood out with clever space utilisation and versatility.

In the 1980s, the models 30 Fly and 285 Ambassador were brought to the market and became best sellers. In the 1990s, Sealine entered the US-market and rose to one of the "Big Four" British motorboat builders (alongside Fairline, Sunseeker and Princess).

Changes of ownership (1998–2013) 

In 1998, a period of substantial changes began. Tom Murrant and his Co-partners sold the company for US$45 million to a group of venture capitalists headed by the English industrialist Gerard Wainwright who started to improve build-quality and design. Only three years later, Wainwright sold Sealine for US$68 million to US-based Brunswick Corporation. The new owner implemented advanced manufacturing structures, widened the range upwards and tried to attract the market with luxury. In 2004, a T60 was launched, the biggest Sealine ever.

Like the whole sector, Sealine was severely hit by the financial and economic crisis 2007/08. In 2011, Brunswick sold the company to US-based private equity firm Oxford Investment Group. In April 2013, Sealine went into administration. Attempts to sell the company as a whole came to nothing. The manufacturing site in Kidderminster was closed. Around 300 employees (that had left from the 600-strong staff in the best days) lost their jobs. The brand besides moulds, plans, parts lists and equipment was purchased by German Aurelius SE, Munich, the parent company of German boat manufacturer HanseYachts.

Restart in Germany (2014–present) 

In 2014, HanseYachts started to produce the adopted Sealine models S450 (formerly SC42) and F450 (formerly F42). A German subcontractor temporarily produced the also adopted S380 (formerly SC35). Furthermore, HanseYachts appointed the British naval architect Bill Dixon as designer for all Sealine models and presented the first new model F380 (SC35 advancement). In 2014/15, the first two Dixon designed models S330 and C330 were launched.

Trivia 

In the late 1980s, a Sealine 285 Ambassador named "Sea Gybsy" starred in the BBC drama "Howards Way".

Current models (specs) 

1 Sport model, 2 Cruiser model,3 Flybridge model, 4 Model with outboard engines

Naval architect: Bill Dixon

Awards 
Sealine F380 – “Motor Boat Award 2015” for the “Best Flybridge under 55 ft”
Sealine S330 and C330 – "Motor Boat Award 2016" for the "Best Sportscruiser up to 45 ft"

References

External links 
 
 Sealine F380 review. Motor Boat & Yachting, August 2014

Yacht building companies
British brands